Engadine, also known as the Captain John K. Hoyt House and Engadine 1885 Inn, is a historic home located near Candler, Buncombe County, North Carolina. It was built in 1885, and is a -story, six bay, rectangular plan, Queen Anne style frame dwelling. It is richly decorated and features inset porches, cantilevered corner balcony, and varied shingled and sawnwork decoration. It is currently used as a bed and breakfast inn.

It was listed on the National Register of Historic Places in 2001.

References

External links
History of Engadine in Candler, NC

Bed and breakfasts in North Carolina
Houses on the National Register of Historic Places in North Carolina
Queen Anne architecture in North Carolina
Houses completed in 1885
Houses in Buncombe County, North Carolina
National Register of Historic Places in Buncombe County, North Carolina